Rebeca Lynn Tamez Jones (born October 18, 1975, in Ciudad Victoria, Tamaulipas) is a former Nuestra Belleza México titleholder. The daughter of a Mexican father and an American mother, Rebeca represented her country in the 1997 Miss Universe pageant on May 16, 1997, in Miami Beach, Florida, U.S..

She joined the Mexican musical group Garibaldi during its last year, and she appeared in former Mexican soap operas.
Rebeca Tamez also represented Mexico in the Miss Continente Americano in 1997 winning the crown and the title.

References

External links

1975 births
Living people
Mexican people of American descent
Miss Universe 1997 contestants
Nuestra Belleza México winners
People from Ciudad Victoria